Ferrinis is a musical duo consisting of Maicol Ferrini and Mattia Ferrini. The group was formed in 2018 and has gained notoriety for their unique blend of dance music genres and Pop.

Career 
Ferrinis is a musical act that was formed by two brothers, Maicol Ferrini (born July 7, 1997) and Mattia Ferrini (born on October 27, 1998). The group was established while the brothers were living in Forlì, Italy during the early stages of the COVID-19 quarantine. Ferrinis is known for their distinctive blend of dance music genres and Pop, and has gained a dedicated fan base for their energetic performances and successful studio releases.

Ferrinis released their debut single in June 2019 and several successful singles in the following years, including "Per Te Morirei," "Musica Caraibica," and "Baila,"  which propelled them to the top of the Italian Dance charts and featured in several popular radios.

In 2020, Ferrinis, have released a new music video for their song "Roulette" on YouTube. The video features a special guest appearance by The Mask, voiced by Pino Quartullo, a dubber for Jim Carrey and others. "Roulette" follows the success of "Davy Crockett," which has garnered over 211,000 YouTube views and half a million Spotify plays. The song explores the theme of gambling addiction, and the video was filmed at the Titano Gaming Hall in San Marino and the Francesco Baracca Aeroclub in Lugo. The video follows the story of two outlaws (The Ferrinis) who have been banned from all casinos except one located in South America. They travel there, where they are greeted and accompanied by The Mask.

In 2022, Ferrinis achieved significant success on the Italian Dance Charts and gained a large following on digital music platforms, with their streams reaching into the millions. The duo has also performed at numerous major events in Italy, including the Holi Dance Festival and the GNX Arena.

References 

Italian music arrangers
Italian male songwriters
Italian musical duos
Pop music duos
Italian pop music groups
1990s births
Living people
People from Forlì